Metro States Media, Inc. was a publication company headquartered in Sunnyvale, California. The company was owned by Dennis Riordan. It published TechWeek (till November 27, 2000) and NurseWeek (till August 14, 2016). NurseWeek was a magazine for registered nurses who resided in 20 U.S. states.

References

External links 
 NurseWeek became part of Nurse.com
 NurseWeek (archive from late 2006)

Companies based in Sunnyvale, California
Defunct companies based in California
Publishing companies based in the San Francisco Bay Area